Kharabali (Qarabaıly) is a town and the administrative center of Kharabalinsky District in Astrakhan Oblast, Russia, located on the left bank of the Akhtuba River (an arm of the Volga)  northwest of Astrakhan, the administrative center of the oblast. Population:

History
It was founded in 1789 as a selo of Kharabalinskoye and was later renamed Kharabali. Town status was granted to it in 1974.

Administrative and municipal status
Within the framework of administrative divisions, Kharabali serves as the administrative center of Kharabalinsky District. As an administrative division, it is, together with two rural localities, incorporated within Kharabalinsky District as the town of district significance of Kharabali. As a municipal division, the town of district significance of Kharabali is incorporated within Kharabalinsky Municipal District as Kharabali Urban Settlement.

References

Notes

Sources

External links

Official website of Kharabali 
Kharabali Business Directory 

Cities and towns in Astrakhan Oblast